Winners is an Australian children's television anthology series conceived and produced for the ACTF by its founding director, Patricia Edgar. It first screened on Network 10 in 1985 as part of the Australian Broadcasting Tribunal's newly implemented C classified drama quota. It featured eight self-contained telemovies and stories. Patricia Edgar was confident that Winners would be a landmark in the development of quality children's television and that it would go on to set the standard nationally and internationally for future children's productions. More Winners is the second season of the series, first screened on ABC in 1990. It featured six self-contained telemovies and stories.

At the forefront of the creators' minds when making the shows was the importance of Australian children having access to a rich and diverse choice of programs that reflected their own society and were appropriate to their particular stage of development. The different episodes dealt with themes of aspirations, friendship, competition, conflict, jealousy, family, lifestyles, independence, decision making, and personal growth. The series had a general theme of young people winning over their circumstances, accepting challenges, gaining confidence, making their own decisions, coming to terms with life, and growing up.

Winners broke new ground for television and for the classroom. Each telemovie was accompanied by a novel, written by the scriptwriter, along with teaching materials to assist classroom teachers. The series was screened in 82 countries around the world and won awards that drew attention to the Australian children's production industry.

Background
In the 1980s, Australian adolescents were a much-neglected television audience. Despite their television viewing increasing at the time, there were few programs that catered to their particular needs and interests, such as relationships, problems, and joys.

Patricia Edgar, director of the ACTF, in association with the Victorian Department of Youth, Sport and Recreation, commissioned a major research project to develop a format, characters, and series concept for a serial aimed specifically at Australian teenagers.

Researchers conducted preliminary work in 1983 on case studies and recent survey data with assistance from the Institute of Family Studies. The foundation wanted to provide a realistic representation of Australian life in the telemovies and to move away from stereotypes. The writers then undertook extensive interviews with police social workers, youth workers, government departments, educators, parents, and naturally, many young people in the projected age range. Don Edgar, foundation director of the Australian Institute of Family Studies, briefed writers on the nature of real Australian families and what actually went on in Australian homes in the mid-1980s.

Winners attracted not only Australia's best writers, producers, and directors at the time, but also one of the nation's leading business identities, Robert Holmes à Court, who provided a worldwide distribution guarantee for the series and agreed to invest in the show.

The show was designed as an anthology that challenged contemporary social issues. It incorporated comedy, science fiction, historical drama, adventure, fantasy, and social realism. It showcased the struggles young children have in growing up and learning to make their own decisions. The series asked parents to consider the pressures on their children as well as those on themselves. Each of the eight films was written about and for children in Australia and raised issues important to children: parents and family life, friendship, independence, authority, peer-group pressure, education, employment, recreation, and the threat of nuclear war.

More Winners was designed as a series of six hour-long tales aimed primarily at the 9-13 age group.

Episodes

Winners

More Winners

Production

Winners
Work on the scripts for Winners commenced in 1983 and included the input of writers such as Anne Brooksbank, John Duigan, Bob Ellis, Morris Gleitzman, Cliff Green, Tom Hegarty, Terry Larsen, Tony Morphett, Maurice Murphy, Jan Sardi, and Roger Simpson. Series script editing was done by Roger Le Mesurier and Sandra Levy. The supervising production manager was Geoff Pollock. Scripting was completed in October 1983 and went into pre-production in May 1984.

As an eight-part anthology series of one television-hour dramas, six episodes were produced in Sydney and two in Melbourne. Episodes commenced production at different times between July 1984 and January 1985, with answer prints of all eight episodes being delivered by 31 March 1985. The series was successfully completed within its budgeted cost of $3.82 million and delivered to the distributor on time and in accordance with its distribution agreement. To assist in marketing and to make the series available to as wide a viewing audience as possible, a decision was made during production to have the series captioned for the hard-of-hearing.

More Winners
The story concepts for More Winners were commissioned in March 1985. The second installment of the show involved such writers as Morris Gleitzman, Roger Simpson, Steve Spears, Mac Gudgeon, Paul Cox, Michael Cove, Ken Cameron, and Jane Oehr. Sandra Levy was the script consultant. Directors attached to the project included Esben Storm, Ken Cameron, Mario Andreacchio, and Michael Pattinson. Production began in early 1990, and the show was launched in June by then-prime minister, Bob Hawke. The foundation produced study kits to accompany the series, and tie-in novels were published as well.

Reception, accolades, and legacy

Selected awards and nominations

Reviews
Both Winners and More Winners received praise from a variety of publications, including Perth's West Australian, who called Winners "...everything children's television should be". West Australia's Wanneroo Times called it "...some of the finest television yet seen in this country", and Melbourne's Herald TV Extra wrote, "Winners proves that learning and being entertained can go hand-in-hand." Other outlets that praised the series included Perth's Weekend News and Sunday Times, Mildura's Sunraysia Daily, The Canberra Times, the Sydney Morning Herald, and Launceston's Sunday Examiner.
More Winners was greeted with reviews such as "If you think quality Australian children's programming is a thing of the past—don't just think again, think More Winners", from Adelaide's The News and "The joy of this series so far has been its desire to have children put in situations where they stretch themselves creatively, intellectually and imaginatively", published in the Sydney Morning Herald. Other positive reviews came from Melbourne's The Sun, Perth's Daily News, and a variety of others.

Screenings and sales

Selected screenings
 Melbourne International Film Festival: "The Big Wish", "His Master's Ghost", and "Boy Soldiers" were screened as part of the Children's and Youth Section of the Melbourne International Film Festival in 1990.
 9th International Film festival for Young Australians: "Second Childhood" was screened at the festival, held in Adelaide in August 1990.
 Film Fest DC: "The Big Wish" was screened in Washington, D.C., in May 1991.
 Harbourfront Festival: "The Big Wish" was shown at this Toronto-based festival in May 1991.
 Beijing TV-International Children's Festival: "Boy Soldiers" and "Mr Edmund" was shown at this event in China in May 1991.
 Banff World Television Festival: "The Big Wish" was selected for screening at this Canadian event in June 1991.
 Cinemagic: "The Big Wish", "His Master's Ghost", "The Journey", "Second Childhood", and "Mr Edmund" were screened as part of a special 'Australian Weekend' at this Irish/Northern Irish children's film festival in December 1991.
 International Kinderfilmfestival: "The Big Wish" was screened as part of a Retrospective of Australian Children's Films 1927–1990 at this German festival in November 1991.

Sales

National
In 1985, Winners was sold to Network 10.

In 1996, Disney Channel Australia acquired pay television rights to both Winners and More Winners.

International
In 1986, Winners was sold to WonderWorks, an award-winning American children's television show. The first episode, "On Loan", aired in March 1996.

Over the years, a variety of nations and territories have acquired rights to the shows, including Japan's NHK, Canada's Knowledge Network, Showtime, Italy's Telepiù, the Netherlands' Kindernet, Panama's FETV, the Zimbabwe Broadcasting Corporation, Iran's Farabi Cinema Foundation and Islamic Republic of Iran Broadcasting, Mexico's Canal Once, Television Nationale du Burkina Faso, and Israeli Educational Television.
Other nations who acquired the series include France, Argentina, the UK, Belgium, Ireland, Thailand, Switzerland, Bosnia and Herzegovina, Hungary, the Cook Islands, Bophuthatswana, Singapore, Czechia, and Indonesia.

Publishing, marketing, and merchandise

Novels
The screenwriters for the series agreed to adapt their screenplays into novels, which were published through McPhee Gribble in Melbourne and distributed through Penguin Books. This was the first time books based on an Australian children's television series were made available in Australia.

Study kits / school video packs
To enhance the series for educational purposes and to promote discussion on wider issues surrounding each episode, a comprehensive study guide was prepared for teachers and parents. The resources were prepared to enable teachers and students to get the most benefit from the series. The study guides were made available to all primary and secondary schools in the metropolitan areas of Sydney, Melbourne, Adelaide, Perth, and Brisbane at such times that coincided with the network screening of the series, state by state. Copies of the guide were also made available in other areas throughout Australia, as and when regional networks purchased the series.

The school video packs contained a VHS video cassette of one episode, the novel, and a study kit packaged in a specially prepared video box. The marketing campaign directed teachers and school librarians and included seminars, direct mail, advertisements in relevant teacher and student journals, and other promotional activities.

In 1990, CBS/FOX Video released new school packs containing a More Winners video, a tie-in novel, and an accompanying study kit.

See also
 Touch the Sun'

References

External links
 
 
 
 
 
 
 
 Winners at the Australian Television Information Archive

1985 Australian television series debuts
1990 Australian television series debuts
Australian Broadcasting Corporation original programming
Australian drama television series
Australian comedy television series
English-language television shows